The 2011 Birmingham City Council Election took place to elect members of Birmingham City Council in the West Midlands, England. One third of the council was up for election, one seat in each of the city's 40 council wards. The election took place at the same day as the 2011 United Kingdom local elections.

Election results

Ward results

References

External links
 List of Candidates by Ward

2011
2011 English local elections
2010s in Birmingham, West Midlands